Madison Township is one of the seventeen townships of Franklin County, Ohio, United States.  The 2010 census found 23,509 people in the township, 10,795 of whom lived in the unincorporated portions of the township.

Geography
Located in the southeastern corner of the county, it borders the following townships and municipalities:
Columbus - north
Brice - northeast
Lithopolis - southeast
Truro Township - northeast
Violet Township, Fairfield County - east
Bloom Township, Fairfield County - southeast
Madison Township, Pickaway County - south
Harrison Township, Pickaway County - southwest corner
Hamilton Township - west
Obetz - northwest

Several municipalities are located in Madison Township:
The city of Canal Winchester, in the east
The city of Columbus, in the north and southwest
The city of Groveport, in the west
The village of Obetz, in the northwest
The city of Pickerington, in the northeast
The census-designated place of Blacklick Estates lies in northern Madison Township.

The following streams run through Madison Township:
Alum Creek
Big Walnut Creek
Blacklick Creek

Name and history
It is one of twenty Madison Townships statewide.

The township was organized in 1810, when its population had reached 500.

Government

The township is governed by a three-member board of trustees, who are elected in November of odd-numbered years to a four-year term beginning on the following January 1. Two are elected in the year after the presidential election and one is elected in the year before it. There is also an elected township fiscal officer, who serves a four-year term beginning on April 1 of the year after the election, which is held in November of the year before the presidential election. Vacancies in the fiscal officership or on the board of trustees are filled by the remaining trustees.

References

External links
Township website
County website

Townships in Franklin County, Ohio
1810 establishments in Ohio
Populated places established in 1810
Townships in Ohio